Superleague Formula 2009: The Game is a video game based on the 2009 season of the Superleague Formula motorsport series. It was developed by Media Game and Image Space Incorporated. It was slated to release sometime in September, but was eventually released on October 31, 2009. It is available for digital download from the series' official website and the official game website.

During the 2009 Donington Park round some star drivers tested out the new game, giving it positive feedback.

Teams' cars
All eighteen liveries from the football clubs in the 2009 season are used in the game:

  A.C. Milan
  A.S. Roma
  Atlético Madrid
  CR Flamengo
  FC Basel 1893
  FC Midtjylland
  F.C. Porto
  Galatasaray S.K.
  Liverpool F.C.
  Olympiacos CFP
  Olympique Lyonnais
  PSV Eindhoven
  Rangers F.C.
  R.S.C. Anderlecht
  SC Corinthians
  Sevilla FC
  Sporting CP
  Tottenham Hotspur

NOTE - Al Ain entered at the start of the 2009 season but do not feature in the game.

Tracks
The six circuits which were used during the 2009 season all featured in the game:
  Circuit de Nevers Magny-Cours
  Circuit Zolder
  Donington Park
  Autódromo do Estoril
  Autodromo Nazionale Monza
  Circuito del Jarama

References

External links
 Superleague Formula Game Official website  (Dead link)

2009 video games
Racing video games
Video games developed in the United States
Windows games
Windows-only games